Yankee Springs State Recreation Area is a state-managed protected area located in Yankee Springs Township in Barry County, Michigan.

It has 120 rustic, 200 modern and 25 equestrian camping sites, plus two cabins. Nine lakes, Gun Lake being the largest, provide fishing, boating and swimming.

Points of interest in the park include the Devil's Soupbowl, a glacially carved kettle formation, Graves Hill Scenic Overlook, The Pines and Civilian Conservation Corps (CCC) era buildings.

The park hosted the annual Barry-Roubaix cycling race for several years, prior to the event moving to Hastings, MI to accommodate a larger number of participants; the race course still traverses parts of the recreation area.

History 
In the 1830s, the Yankee Springs area was opened up for homesteading. By the 1930s the land was eroded and depleted from farming. The federal government acquired the land and the CCC began reforesting the area. In 1943 the land was turned over to the State of Michigan and became a park in the state park system.

Facilities and activities
Facilities and activities include a beach area, fishing, boating, hiking, camping, equestrian, permanent orienteering course, mountain bike trails, and in winter, cross country ski trails, snowshoeing, and groomed fatbike trails.

References

External links
 Yankee Springs Recreation Area and Barry State Game Area Michigan Department of Natural Resources 
 Yankee Springs Camping Reservations Michigan DNR
 Yankee Springs Recreation Area PackYourGear.com

Protected areas of Barry County, Michigan
Important Bird Areas of Michigan
State recreation areas of Michigan
Mountain biking venues in the United States